Morris E. Day (born December 13, 1956) is an American musician and songwriter. He is best known as the lead singer of the Time.

Music career
Morris Day is best known as the lead singer of the Time, a group associated with Prince. Day and Prince attended the same high school  in Minneapolis and in 1974, as teenagers, became bandmates in the band Grand Central.

Morris announced on September 13, 2022 that he will be retiring after his 2023 tour.

Acting career
In addition to his roles in Purple Rain (1984) and Graffiti Bridge (1990), Day also appeared in small parts in films such as Richard Pryor's Moving (1988) and the Andrew Dice Clay film The Adventures of Ford Fairlane (1990). Day's presence on the screen decreased until, in 2001, he returned to film in Kevin Smith's Jay and Silent Bob Strike Back, performing "Jungle Love" with the Time after being introduced emphatically by Jason Mewes' character as "Morris Day and the Time!" and dancing with the movie's stars in the film's coda.

Day also appeared on the small screen in 1990 when he portrayed the character Lamarr on ABC's short-lived sitcom New Attitude. He guest-starred on the sitcom Eve as a pimp who wanted Eve's fashion boutique to design a flamboyant suit to match his witty personality, and appeared as himself in an episode on the series Moesha, attempting to file a lawsuit against Moesha's ex-boyfriend Q, who used a sample from "The Oak Tree" without permission. He also appeared on 227 in the 80s.

He appeared opposite James Avery and Matthew Stewart in a pilot called Heart & Soul produced by Quincy Jones. In 2018, Will Smith revealed that he auditioned on the spot for The Fresh Prince of Bel-Air with a script for a "failed Morris Day pilot" that Jones handed to him.

Legal dispute with Prince Estate
In March 2022, an article written by the Los Angeles Times mentioned that the Prince Estate recently informed Day that he “‘can no longer use Morris Day and the Time in any capacity.’” After reading the letter that was sent to Day from the estate, music industry attorney Erin M. Jacobson mentioned in that same article that it was more accurate to say the letter stated that Day could not claim “‘ownership of the name,’” but there was still opportunity to use the name via an agreement with the Prince Estate that would provide terms for Day to monetarily compensate “‘the trademark owner in exchange for the ability to continue using the name.’”

Discography

Albums

Singles

Filmography

Film

Television

References

Further reading

External links
 Official website
 
 

1956 births
African-American drummers
African-American rock musicians
American dance musicians
Midwest hip hop musicians
American funk drummers
American male drummers
American funk singers
American male pop singers
American soul singers
Living people
Musicians from Minneapolis
Songwriters from Minnesota
The Original 7ven members
Singers from Minnesota
20th-century American drummers
20th-century American male musicians
African-American songwriters
20th-century African-American musicians
21st-century African-American people
American male songwriters